The treerunners are several species of bird in the ovenbird family Furnariidae:

Genus Margarornis:
Ruddy treerunner (Margarornis rubiginosus)
Star-chested treerunner (Margarornis stellatus)
Beautiful treerunner (Margarornis bellulus)
Pearled treerunner (Margarornis squamiger)
Genus Pygarrhichas:
White-throated treerunner (Pygarrhichas albogularis)

Birds by common name